HSwMS Thor was an  coastal defence ship of the Royal Swedish Navy.

Thor had her keel laid down on 26 October 1896 at Bergsunds Yard in Stockholm. She was launched on 7 March 1898, and completed on 7 August 1899. She was struck from service in 1937.

References

1898 ships
Oden-class coastal defence ships
Ships built in Stockholm